Heitor Villa-Lobos's Étude No. 5, part of his Twelve Études for Guitar, was first published by Max Eschig, Paris, in 1953.

History
The autograph manuscript of Etude No. 5, held by the Yale University Library, is dated 1929, France, and is dedicated to Andrés Segovia.

Structure
The piece is in C major and is marked Andantino.

Analysis
Étude No. 5 is a contrapuntal study. The deliberately monotonous accompaniment in broken thirds contrasts with the melody, played on the treble strings.

References

Cited sources

Further reading
 Wright, Simon. 1992. Villa-Lobos. Oxford Studies of Composers. Oxford and New York: Oxford University Press.  (cloth);  (pbk).

Compositions by Heitor Villa-Lobos
Guitar études
Compositions in C major